Jan Šátral (born 24 July 1990, in Melnik) is an inactive Czech tennis player.
Šátral has a career high ATP singles ranking of World No. 136 achieved on 3 October 2016. He also has a career high ATP doubles ranking of World No. 160 achieved on 21 September 2015. He has won 2 Challengers and 9 ITF singles titles and 2 Challengers and 21 ITF doubles titles.

Šátral won his first ATP Challenger title at the 2015 Poprad-Tatry ATP Challenger Tour in the doubles event partnering Roman Jebavý. In July 2016 he won his maiden singles challenger title at Marburg defeating heavily favoured Marco Trungelliti in straight sets.

On his Grand Slam debut in the main draw, he reached the second round of the 2016 US Open as a qualifier where he defeated Mackenzie McDonald in five sets. As a result of this best showing at a Grand Slam he reached a career-high ranking of World No. 136 on 3 October 2016.

Personal life 
In 2019, he married fellow tennis player Denisa Allertová.

Performance timeline

Singles

ATP Challenger & ITF Futures Finals

Singles: 21 (12–9)

Doubles: 36 (26–10)

Davis Cup

Participations: (0–3)

   indicates the outcome of the Davis Cup match followed by the score, date, place of event, the zonal classification and its phase, and the court surface.

References

External links

Czech male tennis players
1990 births
Living people
People from Mělník
Sportspeople from the Central Bohemian Region